Sri Indriyani (born 12 November 1978) is an Indonesian weightlifter who competed in the women's 48 kg weight class at the 2000 Summer Olympics and won the bronze medal, lifting 182.5 kg in total.

She became one of the Olympic Council of Asia flagbearer during the 2018 Asian Games opening ceremony.

Notes and references

External links 

Weightlifters at the 2000 Summer Olympics
Olympic weightlifters of Indonesia
Olympic bronze medalists for Indonesia
1978 births
Living people
Olympic medalists in weightlifting
Asian Games medalists in weightlifting
Weightlifters at the 1998 Asian Games
Indonesian female weightlifters
Medalists at the 2000 Summer Olympics
Asian Games bronze medalists for Indonesia
Medalists at the 1998 Asian Games
Southeast Asian Games bronze medalists for Indonesia
Southeast Asian Games medalists in weightlifting
Competitors at the 2001 Southeast Asian Games
World Weightlifting Championships medalists
20th-century Indonesian women
21st-century Indonesian women